The Red Sea Mall is a shopping mall located in the northern suburb of Jeddah in the Kingdom of Saudi Arabia. The mall is located on the western side of the King Abdulaziz Road (طريق الملك عبدالعزيز) between the King Abdulaziz International Airport and the Red Sea coast. It covers approximately 242,200 square meters of built area. There is a hotel attached to it called "Elaf Jeddah". Main facilities are a Danube supermarket, Sparky's Games City, Virgin Megastore and Jeddah's first cinema; the VOX cinema. The cinema has 12 halls. They are 6 standard, 3 gold, 1 Imax, 1 kid, and 1 VIP. On opening it had both the biggest indoor water fountain and the largest glass covered area in Saudi Arabia. Some restaurants inside the mall include Applebee's, P.F. Chang, Texas Roadhouse, Five Guys, Shake Shack, McDonald's, Burger King, KFC, Al Baik Express, and Nando's

Layout and design
The basic design is a curved building (120°) with the main entrance in the center of the inner curve leading to a set of central courts.

Awards
In 2018, Red Sea Mall has won several awards in the GCC, Africa, & Middle East Business Excellence Awards. Some of the Awards that has won are: Red Sea Mall Cup, ICSC Foundation Award, The Best Shopping Center of the Year for the ITAAM project that was aimed at reducing the waste of food and utilization of the leftover, non-used food by distributing it to the needy,  the productive families campaign, & much more.

See also
 List of shopping malls in Saudi Arabia

References

2008 establishments in Saudi Arabia
Shopping malls established in 2008
Shopping malls in Saudi Arabia
Buildings and structures in Jeddah
Tourist attractions in Jeddah